The Palio di Parma is a festival that is held once a year in the northern Italian town of Parma, and traces back to the ancient "Scarlet Run". The Palio is normally hold on the third weekend of September.

History 
The origin of this festival can be reconducted to 1314 as reported by Giovanni Del Giudice in the  "Chronicon Parmense", talking about a festival hold to honour the engagement between Giberto III Da Correggio, ruler of Parma from 1303 to 1316, and Engelenda Rossi, also called Maddalena Rossi di San Secondo daughter of Guglielmo Rossi and Donella da Carrara rulers of Padova. This brought to an end of the several fight among their noble families wanting to dominate Parma. On that day, all the enemy families of Giberto Da Correggio were allowed to return in Parma, and even some prisoners gained back freedom. The games consisted in several competition with medieval weapons and horses.
The festival was held every year on 15 August, from the fourteenth century to Napoleon's arrival in the nineteenth century.

Nowadays 
Starting from 1978 the competition was brought to a new life. The town is divided in 5 different areas called "Porte", referring to the ancient doors which allowed to enter in the town from the walls of the town. Each of them forms a different team. There are 3 running competitions, one for men, one for women and one for children riding donkeys. In each of them the door try to win a painting showing one of the monuments of the town and Holy Mary, protector of Parma.

Porte

Winning Door

Notes

External links 
 Official site

Festivals in Italy
Historical competitions of Italy
Italian traditions